is a 2012 Japanese CGI anime film written by Kazunori Ito and directed by Hiroshi Matsuyama. It was released on January 21, 2012 in theaters and was released on DVD/Blu-ray on June 28, 2012. The Blu-ray release is a "hybrid" PlayStation 3 disc that includes the film and a fighting game called .hack//Versus.

The movie features a theme song "Hikari wo Atsumete" (Gathering Light) by Japanese music artist KOKIA.

Plot
The story, taking place in 2024, follows the life of Sora Yuki, a 14-year-old girl persuaded by her friends to play the popular game called "The World". Due to an incident in The World, anomalies start occurring in the real world.

Cast
 Saki Fujita as Makoto
 Yukari Fukui as Kaho Hasebe/Masaru Seven
 Nobuyuki Hiyama as Balder
 Marina Inoue as Chieko Tokura/Dasha
 Masako Katsuki as Yuka Kamachi/K-Kei
 Nanami Sakuraba as Yūki Sora
 Kei Tanaka as Tomohiko Okano
 Tori Matsuzaka as Kakeru Tanaka
 Kenichi Ogata as Takefu Yuuki/Take!
 Yasunori Masutani as Gondo
 Megumi Toyoguchi as Hiyori Yuuki

.hack//Versus
.hack//Versus is a fighting game included on the Blu-ray release of .hack//The Movie. The game features characters from throughout the series, including Haseo, Sora, Tsukasa, Ovan, Sakuya, Tokio, Kite, and BlackRose.

Reception
PlayStation LifeStyle's review of the game and movie combo disc noted that the game was "not created to provide a rival to Mortal Kombat or Soul Calibur. This “fighting game” is largely another means of telling the larger .hack story," and went on to say, "As long as you’re looking at it as something that probably wouldn’t have existed as anything other than a throw-in with a movie purchase, you’ll be fine. Enjoy the characters, the world, and the story. That’s what you came to .hack for anyway, right?"

References

Further reading

External links
  
 
 .hack//The Movie at the Internet Movie Database

.hack anime and manga
2012 anime films
2012 computer-animated films
2012 films
Films based on role-playing video games
Films directed by Hiroshi Matsuyama
Films set in 2024
Japanese animated films
Films about video games